William S. Sly (October 19, 1932 – ) is an internationally known physician/scientist who, except for sabbatical years at Oxford and Stanford, spent his entire academic career in St. Louis. Following M.D. training at Saint Louis University School of Medicine, he trained in Internal Medicine at Washington University in St. Louis and in research laboratories at the NIH, in Paris, and in Madison, Wisconsin. He then joined the faculty at Washington University, where he directed the Division of Medical Genetics for 20 years. In 1984, he was recruited to St. Louis University School of Medicine and appointed Alice A. Doisy Professor and Chairman of the Edward A. Doisy Department of Biochemistry and Molecular Biology. He chaired that Department for 26 years. In February 2007, he was also named the inaugural holder of the James B. and Joan C. Peters Endowed Chair in Biochemistry and Molecular Biology. He became an Emeritus Professor in July 2014.

Dr. Sly has made important contributions to several research areas. His group described the first patient with MPS VII (Sly syndrome) and worked with collaborators at The Jackson Laboratory to develop and characterize the mouse model of this disease. He headed studies that identified the mannose-6 phosphate and mannose receptors that target enzymes to lysosomes, which provided the rationale for enzyme replacement therapy in Gaucher’s disease and other lysosomal storage diseases. These discoveries led to his election to the National Academy of Sciences in 1989. He collaborated with the biotechnology company Ultragenyx to develop enzyme replacement for MPS VII (Sly Syndrome), which went into clinical trials in 2017. The drug, Mepsevii, was approved by the FDA that same year.

Dr. Sly also identified the first inherited deficiency of a human carbonic anhydrase, CA II, and defined the biochemical and molecular genetics of this disorder. His laboratory has since characterized many other carbonic anhydrases and produced mouse models of several CA deficiencies. With collaborators, he identified other human diseases attributed to mutations in the genes encoding CA IV, CA VA, and CA XII. Dr. Sly has also done research on hereditary hemochromatosis, collaborating on studies leading to the cloning of the HFE gene and identification of the product it encodes. He also showed that the HFE gene knockout in the mouse produces iron storage resembling human hemochromatosis.

Dr. Sly also contributed to resolution of a famous forensic case involving a “missing murder”. He and his colleague James Shoemaker provided evidence that a woman convicted for poisoning her child with ethylene glycol (antifreeze) and sentenced to life in prison without parole, was wrongly convicted. Instead, her child had the inherited disease methylmalonic acidemia. An abnormally elevated metabolite called propionic acid in the child’s serum had been misidentified as ethylene glycol. These findings led to her release and exoneration.

Dr. Sly has received many awards and honors for his research accomplishments, including induction into the National Academy of Sciences in 1989, the Coriell Medal from the Coriell Institute for Medical Research in Camden, New Jersey, for pioneering work in human genetics, the Peter H. Raven Lifetime Achievement Award from the Academy of Science of St. Louis, the Marcel Simon Prize from The Hemochromatosis Society in Albany, NY and the World Congress of Iron Metabolism in Cairns, Australia, the Distinguished Scientist Award from the Clinical Ligand Assay Society, the Passano Foundation Award (shared with Stuart Kornfeld), and the Burlington Northern Foundation Faculty Achievement Award for outstanding research. Dr. Sly has served on the Scientific Review Board and Medical Advisory Board for the Howard Hughes Medical Institute, the Board of Scientific Overseers for the Jackson Laboratory, and on many scientific societies and other foundations. He served on the editorial boards for several journals and was an editor for the classic metabolic text, The Metabolic and Molecular Bases of Inherited Diseases.

References

External links
Google Scholar Index of Publications by William S. Sly
St. Louis University Department of Biochemistry and Molecular Biology
William S. Sly interviewed by Rare Disease Report
National Organization for Rare Diseases: MPS VII
MPS VII Page on the MPS Society Website

Further reading

 

American biochemists
American geneticists
1932 births
People from East St. Louis, Illinois
Saint Louis University alumni
Saint Louis University faculty
Washington University in St. Louis faculty
Living people